Politics in North Macedonia occur within the framework of a parliamentary representative democratic republic, whereby the Prime Minister is the head of government, and of a multi-party system. Executive power is exercised by the government. Legislative power is vested in both the government and parliament. The Judiciary is independent of the executive and the legislature.

Political system 

The political system of North Macedonia consists of three branches: Legislative, Executive and Judicial.  The Constitution is the highest law of the country. The political institutions are constituted by the will of its citizens by secret ballot at direct and general elections. Its political system of parliamentary democracy was established with the Constitution of 1991, which stipulates the basic principles of democracy and guarantees democratic civil freedom. The Elections for Representatives in the Assembly of North Macedonia is held in October. The Assembly is composed of 123 Representatives, who are elected for a period of four years. Out of this number, 120 are elected proportionally in 6 constituencies of 20 each, and 3 according to the majority principle, specifically for the diaspora (depending on turnout) (the territory of the Republic of North Macedonia representing one constituency). There are approximately 1.5 million voters registered in the General Electoral Roll for the election of Representatives in the Assembly of North Macedonia in 2.973 polling stations. The voting for the representatives is conducted according to the list system.

Presidents 
 Kiro Gligorov (1991–1999)
 Boris Trajkovski (1999–2004)
 Branko Crvenkovski (2004–2009)
 Gjorge Ivanov (2009–2019)
 Stevo Pendarovski (2019–present)

Executive branch 

|President
|Stevo Pendarovski
|SDSM
|12 May 2019
|-
|Prime Minister
|Dimitar Kovačevski
|SDSM
|17 January 2022
|}

Although in Macedonian, these roles have very similar titles ( "President of the Republic of North Macedonia" and  "President of the Government of the Republic of North Macedonia") it is much less confusing to refer to them in English as President and Prime Minister respectively.  These are also the terms used in the English translation of the constitution.

The President 

 cannot hold any other public office or position in a political party
 is elected for a 5-year term and can serve a maximum of two terms
 is Commander-in-Chief of the Armed Forces and President of the Security Council
 nominates a candidate from the majority party or parties in the Assembly who then proposes the Government who are elected by the Assembly
 makes diplomatic appointments and some judicial and Security Council appointments
 grants decorations, honours and pardons

The Government 
The power of the President is fairly limited with all other executive power being vested in what the Constitution describes as the Government, i.e., the Prime Minister and Ministers.

Ministers:
 cannot be Representatives in the Assembly
 cannot hold any other public office or follow a profession while in office
 are elected by a majority vote in the Assembly
 are granted legal immunity
 cannot be called for service in the Armed Forces
 propose laws, budget and regulations to be adopted by the Assembly
 control diplomatic policy
 make other state appointments

Current Cabinet 
The current cabinet is a coalition of SDSM, the Democratic Union for Integration, the New Social Democratic Party, Liberal Democratic Party, Party for the Full Emancipation of the Roma of Macedonia, Democratic Party of Turks and the Party for the Movement of Turks in Macedonia.
The members of the Cabinet of North Macedonia are chosen by the Prime Minister and approved by the national Parliament, however certain cabinet level positions are chosen by both President and Prime Minister, and approved by the Parliament.

New government as of 17 January 2022

Legislative branch 

The Assembly (Sobranie) has 120 members, elected for a four-year term, by proportional representation.
There are between 120 and 140 seats, currently there are 120; members are directly elected in multi-seat constituencies by closed list proportional representation vote. There is a possibility of three people being directly elected in diaspora constituencies by a simple majority vote provided there is sufficient voter turnout.
The last election to be held was on 11 December 2016, with a second round held in one polling station on 25 December 2016. The next election is to be held in 2020.
The result of this election was as follows: percent of vote by party/coalition - VMRO-DPMNE 38.1%, SDSM coalition 36.7%, BDI 7.3%, Besa Movement 4.9%, AfA 3.1%, PDSh 2.7%, other 7.2%; seats by party - VMRO-DPMNE 51, SDSM coalition 49, BDI 10, Besa Movement 5, AfA 3, PDSh 2; note - the 3 seats for diaspora went unfilled because none of the candidates won the 6,500 minimum vote threshold.
Seats by party/coalition as of May 2019 - ruling coalition 68 (SDSM coalition 49, BDI 10, Besa Movement 3, PDSh 2, other 5), opposition coalition 52 (VMRO-DPMNE coalition 48, Besa Movement 2, AfA 2); composition - men 75, women 45, percent of women 37.5%

2020 election result

Judicial branch 
Judiciary power is exercised by courts, with the court system being headed by the Judicial Supreme Court, Constitutional Court and the Republican Judicial Council. The assembly appoints the judges, of which there are 22 in the Supreme Court, and 9 in the Constitutional Court. Supreme Court judges nominated by the Judicial Council, a 7-member body of legal professionals, and appointed by the Assembly; Constitutional Court judges appointed by the Assembly for nonrenewable, 9-year terms

Administrative divisions 
With the passage of a new law and elections held in 2005, local government functions are divided between 78 municipalities (singular: , . The capital, Skopje, is governed as a group of ten municipalities collectively referred to as "the City of Skopje". Municipalities in North Macedonia are units of local self-government.  Neighbouring municipalities may establish cooperative arrangements.

Ethnic diversity 
The country's main political divergence is between the largely ethnically-based political parties representing the country's Macedonian majority and Albanian minority. The issue of the power balance between the two communities led to a brief war in 2001, following which a power-sharing agreement was reached. In August 2004, the Republic's parliament passed legislation redrawing local boundaries and giving greater local autonomy to ethnic Albanians in areas where they predominate.

Foreign relations 
North Macedonia is member of the ACCT,
BIS,
CE,
CEI,
EAPC,
EBRD,
ECE,
FAO,
IAEA,
IBRD,
ICAO,
ICCt,
ICRM,
IDA,
IFAD,
IFC,
IFRCS,
ILO,
IMF,
IMO,
Interpol,
IOC,
IOM (observer),
ISO,
ITU,
NATO,
OPCW,
OSCE,
PCA,
PFP,
UN,
UNCTAD,
UNESCO,
UNIDO,
UPU,
WCL,
WCO,
WHO,
WIPO,
WMO,
WToO,
WTrO (observer)

Most notable relations with other countries include: Greece, China the US and Kosovo amongst others.

Greece 
North Macedonia and Greece have excellent economic, trade and business relations, with Greece being the largest investor in the country. Until the Prespa Agreement (2018), the indeterminate status of North Macedonia's former name arose from a long-running dispute with Greece. The main points of the dispute were:
The flag: the use of Vergina Sun, a Greek state symbol, on the initial national flag used between 1992 and 1995
Constitutional issues: certain articles of the constitution that were seen as claims on Greek territory.
The naming issue was "parked" in a compromise agreed at the United Nations in 1993. However, Greece refused to grant diplomatic recognition to the Republic and imposed an economic blockade that lasted until the flag and constitutional issues were resolved in 1995 with the Interim Accord. The naming dispute was resolved with the Prespa Agreement, which was signed in 2018 and entered into force in February 2019.

United States 
The United States and North Macedonia enjoy excellent bilateral relations. The United States formally recognised North Macedonia on 8 February 1994, and the two countries established full diplomatic relations on 13 September 1995.  The U.S. Liaison Office was upgraded to an embassy in February 1996, and the first U.S. Ambassador to Skopje arrived in July 1996.  The development of political relations between the United States and North Macedonia has ushered in a whole host of other contacts between the two states. In 2004, the United States recognised the country under its constitutional name of that time – Republic of Macedonia.

China 
On 12 October 1993, the Government of the Republic of North Macedonia and the Government of the People's Republic of China (PRC) established diplomatic relations with North Macedonia expressly declaring that the Government of the PRC is the sole legal government of China, and Taiwan as an inalienable part of the Chinese territory. The Government of North Macedonia affirmed it would not establish any form of official relations with Taiwan.

See also 
 Electoral units of North Macedonia
 Together Under One Sun

Notes

References

Further reading